Puritan Passions is a 1923 silent film directed by Frank Tuttle, based on Percy MacKaye's 1908 play The Scarecrow, which was itself based on Nathaniel Hawthorne's short story "Feathertop". The film stars Glenn Hunter, Mary Astor, and stage actor Osgood Perkins. It follows the play faithfully, except that Osgood Perkins' character is called Dickon in the play and Dr. Nicholas in the movie, and Justice Gilead Merton is renamed Justice Gilead Wingate in the film. It is the only theatrical film version – so far – of Percy MacKaye's play, though there were previously two silent film versions of Hawthorne's original story.

Plot
Goody Rickby is impregnated by the wealthy Gilead Wingate, after which he refuses to accept the responsibility of fatherhood. Goody decides to use black magic to get revenge on Wingate. She succeeds in summoning Satan before her, and together they concoct a scheme to punish the man who wronged her. Satan creates a living being from a scarecrow and the creature adopts the human identity of "Lord Ravensbane" so that he can function unsuspected in society. Satan instructs his creature to seduce Wingate's niece Rachel and fool the villagers into believing the Wingates are all witches. Ravensbane develops emotions and a soul, however, and genuinely falls in love with the young lady, foiling the Devil's plans.

Cast
Glenn Hunter - Lord Ravensbane/The Scarecrow
Mary Astor - Rachel
Osgood Perkins - Dr. Nicholas
Maude Hill - Goody Rickby
Frank Tweed - Gillead Wingate
Dwight Wiman - Bugby
Thomas Chalmers - The Minister
Elliot Cabot - Richard Talbot

Preservation status
This film is now lost.

References

Further reading
 "Publicity Stunts: Orchestrations Written Specifically for 'Puritan Passions". Film News. October 15, 1923. Vol. 1, No. 5
 "Converse Score for Film Heard at Cameo Theater". Musical America. October 27, 1923. Vol. 39, Iss. 1
 "'Puritan Passions Given Boston Pre-View'". Motion Picture News. January 12, 1924. Vol. XXIX, No. 2
 M. J. (July 17, 1924). "Reviews and New Music: 'Scarecrow Sketches for the Piano' by Frederick S. Converse".  Musical Courier. Vol. 89, Iss. 3. p. 21

External links 
 
 

American films based on plays
American silent feature films
Films directed by Frank Tuttle
American black-and-white films
1923 films
Films based on works by Nathaniel Hawthorne
1923 comedy-drama films
Lost American films
Films distributed by W. W. Hodkinson Corporation
1923 lost films
Lost comedy-drama films
Films based on adaptations
1920s American films
Silent American comedy-drama films